In and of the Self is the debut album by Canadian metalcore band Buried Inside. It was released on Matlock Records in 1999.

Track listing

Credits
 Backing Vocals – Tweedy*, Ben*, Mitch*, Steve*
 Bass – Steve Martin 
 Cover Picture - Gordie Ball 
 Artwork-Neil Hamilton
 Drums – Mike Godbout
 Engineer [Assistant] – Tweedy*, Nick Cotton
 Engineer, Co-producer – Jason Jaknunas
 Guitar – Andrew Tweedy, Matias Palacios-Hardy
 Photography By [Pictures] – A. McCracken*, G. Ball*, N. Hovbraken*, N. Shaw*, S. Scallen*
 Producer – Buried Inside
 Vocals – Nick Shaw

Notes
 Recorded, mixed & mastered during the first 4 months of 1999 @ Raven St. Studios, Ottawa.

1999 debut albums
Buried Inside albums